Louis Christian Klein (October 13, 1832June 25, 1900) was an American  businessman, and Wisconsin pioneer.  He was a member of the Wisconsin State Assembly, representing the city of Racine in the 1885 session.  He was considered the father of the Racine County Insane Asylum.

Biography
Louis C. Klein was born in October 1832 in the town of Oberstein, in the principality of Birkenfeld, in the area that is now the Rhineland-Palatinate region of Germany.  When he was a child, his parents moved to France, where he and his siblings were educated.  After his father's death, he emigrated to the United States with his mother, brother, and sister, landing first at New Orleans.  His mother purchased a hotel and boarding house in Louisville, Kentucky, around 1850, which she operated for several years, and continued to own until it was destroyed in riots during Reconstruction.  They came to Racine, Wisconsin, in 1855.

In Racine, Louis established a merchant business on Main Street, dealing in liquor, tobacco, toys, and other goods imported from Europe.  He later took on his brother, Frederick, as a partner, renaming the business "Klein & Brother".  He sold out his share of the business to his brother in 1872.  His success in the merchant business enabled him to buy significant real estate in Racine.

He was a member of the Racine city council in 1860, 1875, and 1876, and also served on the Racine County board of supervisors in 1875, 1876, and 1888.  He also served for several years on the Racine board of education.

In 1884, he was elected to the Wisconsin State Assembly, running on the Republican Party ticket.  He defeated the Democratic incumbent, William P. Packard, and represented Racine County's first Assembly district, which then comprised just the city of Racine.  He ran for re-election in 1886, but was defeated by Edward Alden Egery.

After leaving the Assembly, he was involved in the effort to establish a new insane asylum in Racine County.  He helped move the proposal through the Racine County board, and was then selected to serve on the Asylum board of trustees.  The Racine County Insane Asylum opened in 1889, and Klein remained involved in the maintenance of the organization for the rest of his life.

Personal life and family
Louis C. Klein was the eldest of three children born to Louis Christian Klein and his wife Theresia.  His brother, Frederick W. Klein, ran for mayor of Racine in 1901, but was defeated by the incumbent mayor, Michael Higgins.

Louis Klein married Mary Jane Bliss, the daughter of Charles Frederick Bliss, another German American immigrant and Racine pioneer.  They had two children together.  Their daughter, Leona, married Theodore K. Birkhaeuser, a Milwaukee dentist who went on to serve as a major in the United States Volunteers during the Philippine–American War.  Their son, Louis, was also a successful businessman in Racine, but he died just four years after his father, due to Appendicitis.

Electoral history

Wisconsin Assembly (1884, 1886)

| colspan="6" style="text-align:center;background-color: #e9e9e9;"| General Election, November 8, 1884

| colspan="6" style="text-align:center;background-color: #e9e9e9;"| General Election, November 2, 1886

References

External links
 

1832 births
1900 deaths
People from Birkenfeld (district)
Oldenburg emigrants to the United States
Wisconsin city council members
Republican Party members of the Wisconsin State Assembly